Céloron de Blainville is a French family of officers and colonial administrators, who notably played a role in New France beginning in the 17th century. One member, Pierre Joseph Céloron de Blainville, is the subject of a folk song by  Robert Schmertz entitled  Celoron.

Persons
Famous Céloron de Blainville family are :
Jean-Baptiste Céloron de Blainville (born 1660 in Paris (France), still living in 1730), "seigneur" of Blainville, Quebec in New France. He married Hélène Picoté de Belestre, daughter of a military commander of Montreal.
 his son Pierre Joseph Céloron de Blainville (1693–1759), leader of the 1749 Ohio expedition.
 Paul Louis Maxime Celoron de Blainville (1831–1889), gouvernor of Mayotte in 1887-1888 Son of Pierre-Louis Céloron de Blainville (1753-??) and grandson of Pierre Joseph Céloron.

Attention
The way of writing Céloron de Blainville is often wrong especially in modern documents :
 "Céloron" (or often Celoron in texts in English) is often miswritten "Celeron" ou "Céleron", because of confusion with the Intel Celeron chipset of 2002.
 "Blainville" is often miswritten "Bienville", because of confusion with the name of the New France hero Jean-Baptiste Le Moyne de Bienville.
 So the writing "Celeron de Bienville" is common on the Internet but wrong.

Places
From the family Céloron de Blainville, came :
Celoron, New York, a village in New York state, USA.
Boulevard Céloron, in Blainville, Quebec, Canada.
Blainville, Quebec, a city in Quebec.
Blainville (electoral district) in Quebec.

References

French families